Cargills Bank Limited is a licensed commercial bank in Sri Lanka. It received its license from Central Bank of Sri Lanka to operate domestic and offshore banking business on 21 January 2014 and was ceremonially opened on 30 June 2014. At present the bank consists of 17 branches island-wide with the head office based in Kollupitiya.

Partners 
The largest shareholders of Cargills Bank Limited are Cargills (Ceylon) PLC and C T Holdings PLC, both highly diversified conglomerates listed in the Colombo Stock Exchange with interests in entertainment, hospitality trade, property development, manufacturing, food processing and retailing. Cargills Ceylon PLC, a Sri Lankan corporate established in 1844 is built on a strong foundation of values and ethics.

Cargills Bank is also well partnered through investments of leading corporates in the country whose brands, financial performance, market share and business foresight have been in the highest echelons of their respective fields. Most significant amongst them are; Employees Provident Fund (EPF), MJF Foundation Investments (Pvt) Ltd, Melwa Group, AIA Holdings Lanka (Pvt) Ltd, Softlogic Holdings PLC, Phoenix Ventures Ltd, MAS Capital (Pvt) Ltd, Asian Alliance Insurance PLC, Rosewood (Pvt) Ltd, Lalan Rubber Holdings (Pvt) Ltd.

References

 http://www.island.lk/index.php?page_cat=article-details&page=article-details&code_title=144682
 http://www.ft.lk/article/511715/President-opens-Cargills-Square-Mall-and-Cargills-Bank-in-Jaffna
 http://www.island.lk/index.php?page_cat=article-details&page=article-details&code_title=135026
 http://www.ft.lk/article/315722/CB-Chief-hails-Cargills-Bank-for-championing-spirit-of-progress

External links
 Official Website

Banks of Sri Lanka